Maurice Gerard Collins is an Irish lawyer who has been a judge of the Supreme Court of Ireland since November 2022. He served on the Court of Appeal between 2019 and 2022 and worked as a barrister prior to becoming a judge.

Early life 
Collins is from Clonakilty in County Cork. His father's uncle was Michael Collins. He completed a BA in English Literature and Philosophy at University College Cork and later attended the King's Inns.

Legal career 
He was called to the Bar in 1989 and became a senior counsel in 2003. He is a former chair of the Incorporated Council for Law Reporting and became a bencher of the King's Inns in 2017.

Collins had a broad practice while at the bar. He frequently represented the State in public law matters. He appeared for the State in a challenge taken by Brian Mohan to the constitutionality of parliamentary gender quota legislation and an action initiated by Jolyon Maugham to try to prevent Brexit through the High Court.

His practice included commercial matters and disputes. He represented parties opposite Rory McIlroy and Dunnes Stores. He also appeared in actions involving medical negligence.

He appeared for Ireland in 2019 in the EU's General Court in appeal to the European Commission's decision arising from the EU illegal State aid case against Apple in Ireland.

Judicial career

Court of Appeal 
He became a Judge of the Court of Appeal in November 2019. His appointment arose out of a vacancy was created due to the retirement of Michael Peart.

Law Reform Commission 
Collins was appointed to the Law Reform Commission as a part-time commissioner for a five-year term in October 2020.

Supreme Court 
Collins was nominated and appointed to the Supreme Court of Ireland in November 2022.

Personal life 
He is married to Nora Rice. They are patrons of the National Gallery of Ireland.

References 

Living people
Alumni of University College Cork
Judges of the Court of Appeal (Ireland)
Judges of the Supreme Court of Ireland
21st-century Irish judges
Alumni of King's Inns
Year of birth missing (living people)